Mark Paterson (born February 22, 1964) is a Canadian former professional ice hockey player.

Early life 
Paterson was born in Ottawa, Ontario. As a youth, he played in the 1977 Quebec International Pee-Wee Hockey Tournament with a minor ice hockey team from Nepean, Ontario.

Career 
Paterson played in 29 National Hockey League games with the Hartford Whalers over parts of four seasons between 1983 and 1985. The rest of his career, which lasted from 1983 to 1989, was spent in different minor leagues.

Career statistics

Regular season and playoffs

International

References

External links

1964 births
Living people
Binghamton Whalers players
Canadian ice hockey defencemen
Hartford Whalers draft picks
Hartford Whalers players
Ice hockey people from Ottawa
Moncton Golden Flames players
Nepean Raiders players
Ottawa 67's players
Saginaw Hawks players